Robert Hutton may refer to:
Robert Hutton (metallurgist) (1876–1970), English metallurgist, known for assisting academics to flee Nazi Germany
Robert Hutton (divine) (died 1568), English cleric and Marian exile
Robert Hutton (politician) (died 1870), Irish politician, MP for Dublin City, 1837–1841
Robert Howard Hutton (1840–1887), English bonesetter
Bob Hutton (1872–1920), British sport shooter
Robert Hutton (footballer) (1879–1958), English footballer
Robert Hutton (actor) (1920–1994), American actor
Bobby Hutton (1950–1968), treasurer and first recruit of the Black Panther Party
Rob Hutton (born 1967), American businessman and member of the Wisconsin State Assembly